Mystaria: The Realms of Lore, released as Riglord Saga in Japan, is a tactical role-playing game for the Sega Saturn. In late 1996 it was re-released as Blazing Heroes in North America. Its graphics consist of pre-rendered sprites and polygonal backgrounds. Its sequel, Riglord Saga 2, was released in Japan only in 1996.

Story
Ten years ago, the legendary Twelve Warriors fought against the War-Mage Bane to stop his plans to take over the continent of Mystaria. But Bane was not defeated, he was only forced to retreat to his own kingdom.

Ten years have passed, and his army, commanded by five super-powerful leaders, has managed to abduct the Queen of the realm before retreating. Prince Aragon, the Queen's only son and the hero of our story, has lost his rightful throne. But in Queensland's darkest hour he knows he is the only hope left, and will fight to the end to win back his homeland.

Prince Aragon needs help. The five commanders under Bane's command are powerful adversaries. Aragon must enlist the aid of eleven adventurers, the strongest warriors he can find. He must travel through the lands of Mystaria, fighting Bane's legions as he gathers his group together for the final showdown – against the dreaded War-Mage Bane himself!

The player controls Aragon and his party to try to reclaim the land to free the people. Aragon's mother, the Queen of Queensland, has been placed under a spell by Lord Bane and has handed her country over to him. Lord Bane has complete control over her and she believes that the prince and the others are traitorous rebels.

Gameplay
The player manipulates characters along grid-based battlefields, upon which the characters may interact with objects, enemies, and other characters that are within their range. Battles are turn-based according to party; first the player maneuvers all his party members, then the enemy AI maneuvers all enemy units, then the player takes control again, and so on. Each turn, the player can move each character once and have them either attack, defend, cast a spell, or use an item. Unlike most Tactical RPGs, battles in Mystaria frequently require something other than eliminating all enemy units to be completed, such as reaching a specific destination or avoiding contact with enemies entirely.

Playing as primarily Aragon, the player gathers a team of 12 heroes. The recruitment of team members, however, is non-linear and the story adjusts itself to the newest character that has joined.

Each characters has specific fighting techniques and will develop new techniques with practice. Which techniques are learned next depends on which already known techniques the characters practice, allowing creative development of each character. For example, utilizing Ferral's "Spear Attack" will lead to Ferral learning stronger Spear techniques such as "Spinning Spear" more quickly, while using "Punch" and "Kick" will help him acquire more Hand to Hand techniques such as "Martial Throw" and "Hundred Hands". Once acquired, new techniques must be added to the character's quick menu so that they can actually be used. Additionally, all techniques used by enemies can be acquired by having Galford use "Steal Technique".

The graphics are in 3D throughout the game, and a few battlefields take place on multiple levels. Three different views are possible for playing the game: aerial, 1st person, and horizontal. It is also possible to view a grid overlay of the battlefield.

Reception

On release, Famicom Tsūshin scored the game a 31 out of 40, giving it a 9 out of 10 in their Reader Cross Review. Sega Saturn Magazine argued that the game has too little story to win over European gamers, most of whom held a firm dislike for RPGs at the time Mystaria was released. Electronic Gaming Monthly commented that the menu system seems cumbersome at first but proves to be easily accessible and engaging. Though some of the reviewers felt the battles went on too long, they all praised the high level of strategy the game demands of the player. Maximum contended that Mystaria has too much gameplay, and that it should have focused more on cutscenes. They also criticized the absence of voice acting, and concluded that "at times it's even quite good fun and it's certainly big enough to warrant a purchase if you like these kinds of titles anyway. However, it's not going to win over any new recruits, because it gets very tedious at times." GamePro praised the graphics, particularly the rotation and scaling used in the attack animations, but criticized the music and absence of voice acting, and argued that turn-based strategy games are by definition boring. Next Generation stated that "for those eager to get a look at a next generation RPG, Riglord Saga is not at all a bad place to start."

References

External links

 Review at SEGA-SKY

1995 video games
Microcabin games
Sega video games
Sega Saturn games
Sega Saturn-only games
Tactical role-playing video games
Video games developed in Japan